Peter Kofod Poulsen (born 27 February 1990) is a Danish politician who was elected as a Member of the European Parliament in 2019. He served in the Folketing from June 2015 to June 2019.

During his term in the Folketing, he represented the Danish People's Party (DPP). As of July 2019, the DPP is on the parliamentary group Identity and Democracy.

Biography
The son of a blacksmith and nurse, he graduated from the Signal Regiment in 2010 and later worked as a primary school teacher in Haderslev. He was a city councillor in Haderslev beginning in 2014, and was in the regional council for Southern Denmark from 2014–2015.

He adopted the surname Hristov when he married his wife Vasileva in 2018. In political contexts he is referred to solely as "Peter Kofod".

References

External links
 Website on the Danish People's Party's site

1990 births
Living people
MEPs for Denmark 2019–2024
People from Bornholm
Members of the Folketing 2015–2019
Members of the Folketing 2022–2026